Isogai (written: 磯貝, 磯谷 or 礒貝) is a Japanese surname. Notable people with the surname include:

, Japanese judoka
, Japanese footballer
, Japanese general
, Japanese singer and musician
, Japanese sport wrestler

Fictional characters
, a character in the manga series Assassination Classroom

See also
8251 Isogai, a Mars-crossing asteroid

Japanese-language surnames